José Presas y Marull (?-1842) was a Spanish attorney, writer, politician, diplomat and historian of Catalan origin. He served as private secretary of Carlota Joaquina of Spain.

Biography 

José Presas was born Sant Feliu de Guíxols (Province of Girona), son of Jerónimo Roselló y Presas and Margarita Morull. He settled in Buenos Aires near the year 1790, being a student of the College of San Carlos and probably got his doctorate in law at University of Saint Francis Xavier. José Presas was nephew of Francisco Marull, owner of the Botica del Colegio, a pharmacy located in front of the Church of San Ignacio.

In 1805, José Presas was arrested and then released, accused of wanting to destabilize the government of the viceroy Sobremonte. He supported the British during the invasions in the Río de la Plata, taking refuge in 1808 in Rio de Janeiro, where he was appointed secretary of the Infanta Carlota, daughter of Charles IV of Spain.

José Presas y Marull had maintained cordial relations with the American and English community, established in the Buenos Aires colonial. In 1804, he was godson of John Cook (born in Boston), baptized in the Cathedral of Buenos Aires on 8 November of the same year.

References

External links 
Derrotero de un espía (La Nación)

1842 deaths 
Year of birth missing
Lawyers from Catalonia
People from Buenos Aires
People from Rio de Janeiro (city)